Yanaqucha (Quechua yana black, very dark, qucha lake, "black lake", Hispanicized spelling Yanacocha, Yanagocha) is a lake in the Andes of  Peru located in the Huánuco Region, Ambo Province, Ambo District. It is situated between the mountains Yanahirka ("black mountain", Hispanicized Yanahirca) in the southwest and Yanaqucha in the northeast.

References 

Lakes of Peru
Lakes of Huánuco Region